Holosticha apodiademata is a species of littoral ciliates, first found near King George Island.

References

Hypotrichea
Species described in 2008